Nikolai Sergeyev (August 4, 1908 – January 13, 1989) was a Russian painter.

Nikolai Sergeyev was born in the village of Kriukov in the rural district of Vereiskii. In 1924 he moved to Moscow. He attended courses at the Artists’ Association of Revolutionary Russia guided by Ilya Mashkov and studied at Surikov Institute under Boris Ioganson. In 1942 Nikolai became a member of the USSR Union of Artists. In 1943 Nikolai Sergeyev was evacuated to Samarkand, Uzbekistan.

External links
Artist's biography

20th-century Russian painters
Russian male painters
Soviet painters
1908 births
1989 deaths
20th-century Russian male artists